Bridle Drift Dam is a rock-fill type dam on the Buffalo River, near East London, Eastern Cape, South Africa. It was first constructed in 1969 and renovated in 1994. The purpose of the dam is for industrial and domestic use, the reservoir is now the main drinking water supply for Buffalo City.

See also
List of reservoirs and dams in South Africa
List of rivers of South Africa

References 

Dams in South Africa
Dams completed in 1969